Manuela Kraller (born 1 August 1981) is a German soprano singer. She is best known as the former lead singer of symphonic metal band Xandria from late 2010 until late 2013. She was formerly one of the soprano vocalists in the symphonic metal band Haggard. She now has a project that strays away from the metal scene and more of a classical style instead that's called "Valkea Valo" with her friend Tobias Gut.

Musical career 

Manuela began her musical life in 2005 at the age of 23 while singing in a Finnish choir group, and discovered her new passion was singing. She began to take classical singing lessons and sang in more church and gospel choirs, and was soon asked to become a solo singer. She grew up with rock and metal music, and wanted to combine it with her classical background, and so began singing rock and metal music songs. She unsuccessfully auditioned to be the new lead singer of Nightwish in 2006.

While writing her own songs, she joined the Swiss band Nagor Mar, but shortly, she left and became a vocalist for German musical group Haggard. She only performed with Haggard live with no studio albums. On 19 December 2010, she became the new singer of Xandria after Lisa Middelhauve finished performing the rest of the live tour dates after Kerstin's departure. On 7 January 2011, she debuted live with Xandria at the "Classic Meets Pop" event at the Seidensticker Halle in Bielefeld, and performed their 2004 hit song, "Ravenheart", with the Bielefeld Philharmonic Orchestra. She then toured with Xandria on the Out of The Dark tour. On 28 November 2011, Xandria announced they would release their first album with Kraller titled Neverworld's End and released the album's first and only single "Valentine" on 14 February 2012, followed by their music video with Manuela. She then went on tour with Epica, Stream of Passion and Kamelot on their Neverworld's End tour.

In August 2013, Manuela has collaborated with the former lead singer of Amberian Dawn singer Heidi Parviainen a duet on her new project Dark Sarah for her future upcoming album.

But as of 25 October, the band announced on their website that Manuela Kraller had left the band to pursue a different career and was succeeded by Dutch singer and Ex Libris frontwoman Dianne van Giersbergen (who is also no longer the frontwoman of Xandria). Manuela leaves the band with regret but also full of gratitude, thanking Xandria and fans for the time together and being grateful for the "wonderful moments in mutual tours and shows". She wished Dianne and the band all the very best for the future.

On 6 April Heidi Parviainen confirmed on Dark Sarah's Facebook page that Manuela Kraller is about to guest again on Dark Sarah's second album called The Puzzle.

Influences 
She was inspired by symphonic metal bands. She claims Amy Lee, Tarja Turunen and Anneke van Giersbergen was a very early influences for her singer style, She said Nightwish, Kamelot and Within Temptation are her personal favorites.

Discography

Nagor Mar 
Songs released (2009):
 Bleeding Rose
 Passion
 Deliverance
 Bleeding Rose (Part II)

Xandria 

Studio albums:
 Neverworld's End (2012)

Singles:
 Valentine (2012)

Solo work 
 O Holy Night (2013)

Valkea Valo 
 TBA

Alanae (solo project) 

Singles
 Return to elements (2020)

Guest vocal appearances 
 Guest vocals on At the Edge by Voices of Destiny and part of the choir on the album Crisis Cult (2014)
 Memories Fall by Dark Sarah from the album Behind the Black Veil (2015)
 Rain by Dark Sarah from the album The Puzzle (2016)

References

External links 
 

1981 births
English-language singers from Germany
Women heavy metal singers
German heavy metal singers
German women singer-songwriters
German sopranos
Living people
People from Berchtesgadener Land
21st-century German women singers